Helgi Sallo (born 10 August 1941 in Tallinn) is an Estonian singer and actress.

In 1965, she graduated from the ESSR Theatre Union’s Drama Studio in Tallinn (now, the Estonian Academy of Music and Theatre).

Sallo was married to opera singer Uno Heinapuu (:et). Her daughter is actress Liina Vahtrik.

Awards 
 Honored Artist of the Estonian SSR (1975)
 Georg Ots Prize (1983).
 People's Artist of the Estonian SSR (1989)
 Suure Vankri Award (1996)
Order of the White Star (2001)
 Tallinn Badge (2017)

References

External links

 
 Helgi Sallo discography at Discogs
 Helgi Sallo, seesama, kes laulab Horoskoobis ja käis isegi meie juures maal külas

1941 births
Living people
Recipients of the Order of the White Star, 5th Class
20th-century Estonian women opera singers
Actresses from Tallinn
Estonian operatic sopranos
Estonian musical theatre actresses
Estonian stage actresses
Estonian television actresses
Estonian film actresses
Estonian Academy of Music and Theatre alumni
20th-century Estonian actresses
21st-century Estonian actresses